Akhtarul Islam Shahin is an Indian politician from Rashtriya Janata Dal. He is a member of Bihar Legislative Assembly representing Samastipur (Vidhan Sabha constituency) in Bihar. Since 2010 he has served 3 times as Member of Bihar Legislative Assembly from Samastipur.

References 

Bihar MLAs 2015–2020
Bihar MLAs 2020–2025
People from Samastipur district
Rashtriya Janata Dal politicians
Living people
Year of birth missing (living people)